Mackenzie Christine Foy (born November 10, 2000) is an American actress and model. She is known for portraying Renesmee Cullen in the 2012 film The Twilight Saga: Breaking Dawn – Part 2, which earned her a Young Artist Award nomination as Best Supporting Young Actress in a Feature Film. She portrayed young Murphy in the 2014 space epic Interstellar, for which she received a Saturn Award for Best Performance by a Younger Actor among other awards nominations. She starred as Clara in Disney's 2018 film The Nutcracker and the Four Realms.

Early life 
Foy was born on November 10, 2000 in Los Angeles, where she was raised. Her father, a truck driver, and mother, a homemaker, had no connections to the film industry. Foy began modeling at age 3, and started acting at age 9. Mackenzie Foy is a practitioner of Taekwondo.

Career
Foy began modeling in print ads in 2004, working for Garnet Hill, Polo Ralph Lauren and Guess. From there, she modeled for companies such as The Walt Disney Company, Mattel and Gap.

Foy's acting career began when she was nine years old, when she guest-starred in television shows such as 'Til Death, FlashForward and Hawaii Five-0. In 2010, she was cast as Renesmee Cullen in the film adaptation of Stephenie Meyer's book Breaking Dawn, the fourth and final novel in the Twilight saga series. The first movie, The Twilight Saga: Breaking Dawn – Part 1, in which Renesmee is shown only in a flash-forward, was released on November 18, 2011, while the second, The Twilight Saga: Breaking Dawn – Part 2, on November 16, 2012.

In February 2012, she joined the cast of James Wan's horror film The Conjuring. Shooting on the film began in February 2012 in North Carolina, and it was released in July 2013. In February, she was also in the last episode of the second season of the horror TV series R. L. Stine's The Haunting Hour, in which she played Natalie, a girl who goes to live with her grandfather and discovers that one of the dolls is alive and has bad intentions.

On October 10, 2012, Foy joined Wish You Well, the film adaptation of David Baldacci's book, where she played the lead. On November 17, 2012, Foy was in another episode of R. L. Stine's The Haunting Hour, playing Georgia Lomin. In 2014, Foy appeared in Erica Dunton's movie Black Eyed Dog.

Foy co-starred as the childhood version of Matthew McConaughey's daughter in Christopher Nolan's Interstellar. She provided the voice of Celestine in the English dub of Ernest & Celestine (2012), Violet in The Boxcar Children (2014) and The Little Girl in The Little Prince (2015). In July 2016, it was announced that Foy would play the lead role of Clara in the film The Nutcracker and the Four Realms.

In May 2019 it was announced that Foy would co-star with Kate Winslet in a new adaptation of Black Beauty, which began filming in October of that year.

Filmography

Film

Television

Awards and nominations

References

External links 
 
 

2000 births
21st-century American actresses
American child actresses
American child models
American film actresses
Actresses from Los Angeles
American television actresses
American voice actresses
Living people
American female taekwondo practitioners